This is a list of Portuguese monarchs who ruled from the establishment of the Kingdom of Portugal, in 1139, to the deposition of the Portuguese monarchy and creation of the Portuguese Republic with the 5 October 1910 revolution.

Through the nearly 800 years in which Portugal was a monarchy, the kings held various other titles and pretensions. Two kings of Portugal, Ferdinand I and Afonso V, also claimed the crown of Castile. When the House of Habsburg came into power, the kings of Spain, Naples, and Sicily also became kings of Portugal. The House of Braganza brought numerous titles to the Portuguese Crown, including King of Brazil and then de jure Emperor of Brazil.

After the demise of the Portuguese monarchy, in 1910, Portugal almost restored its monarchy in a revolution known as the Monarchy of the North, though the attempted restoration only lasted a month before destruction. With Manuel II's death, the Miguelist branch of the house of Braganza became the pretenders to the throne of Portugal. They have all been acclaimed king of Portugal by their monarchist groups.

The monarchs of Portugal all came from a single ancestor, Afonso I of Portugal, but direct lines have sometimes ended. This has led to a variety of royal houses coming to rule Portugal, though all having Portuguese royal lineage. These houses are:

 House of Burgundy (1139–1383)
 House of Aviz (1385–1580)
 House of Habsburg (1581–1640)
 House of Braganza (1640–1910)

House of Burgundy (1139–1383)

The Portuguese House of Burgundy, known as the Afonsine Dynasty, was the founding house of the Kingdom of Portugal. Prior to the independence of Portugal, the house ruled the feudal County of Portugal, of the Kingdom of Galicia. When Afonso Henriques declared the independence of Portugal, he turned the family from a comital house to a royal house which would rule Portugal for over two centuries.
When Ferdinand I died, a succession crisis occurred between 1383 and 1385. Ferdinand's daughter Beatrice of Portugal was proclaimed queen and her husband John I of Castile proclaimed king by the right of his wife. Her legitimacy as a monarch is disputed.

House of Aviz (1385–1580)
The House of Aviz, known as the Joanine Dynasty, succeeded the House of Burgundy as the reigning house of the Kingdom of Portugal. The house was founded by John I of Portugal, who was the Grand Master of the Order of Aviz. When King John II of Portugal died without an heir, the throne of Portugal passed to his cousin, Manuel, Duke of Beja. When King Sebastian of Portugal died, the throne passed to his uncle, Henry of Portugal (he might be called Henry II because Henry, Count of Portugal, father of Alphonso I of Portugal, was the first of that name to rule Portugal).  When Henry died, a succession crisis occurred and António, Prior of Crato, was proclaimed António of Portugal.

House of Habsburg (1581–1640)
The House of Habsburg, known as the Philippine Dynasty, is the house that ruled Portugal from 1581 to 1640. The dynasty began with the acclamation of Philip II of Spain as Philip I of Portugal in 1580, officially recognized in 1581 by the Portuguese Cortes of Tomar. Philip I swore to rule Portugal as a kingdom separate from his Spanish domains, under the personal union known as the Iberian Union.

House of Braganza (1640–1910)
The House of Braganza, also known as the Brigantine Dynasty, came to power in 1640, when John II, Duke of Braganza, claimed to be the rightful heir of the defunct House of Aviz, as he was the great great grandson of King Manuel I. John was proclaimed King John IV, and he deposed the House of Habsburg in the Portuguese Restoration War.

The descendants of Queen Maria II and her consort, King Ferdinand II (a German prince of the House of Saxe-Coburg and Gotha), came to rule in 1853. Portuguese law and custom treated them as members of the House of Braganza, though they were still Saxe-Coburg and Gotha dynasts. This has led some to classify these last four monarchs of Portugal as members of a new royal family, called the House of Braganza-Saxe-Coburg and Gotha, though this view is not widely held.

See also

List of Portuguese royal consorts
List of viceroys of Portugal
List of titles and honours of the Portuguese Crown
Style of the Portuguese sovereign
 Families
 Family tree of Portuguese monarchs
 Descendants of John VI of Portugal
 Descendants of Manuel I of Portugal
 Descendants of Miguel I of Portugal

References

Bibliography

 
 Jiří Louda & Michael Maclagan (1981), "Portugal", in Lines of Succession. Heraldry of the Royal families of Europe, London, Orbis Publishing, pp. 228–237. . (revised and updated edition by Prentice Hall College Div - November 1991. .)
 Luís Amaral & Marcos Soromenho Santos (2002), Costados do Duque de Bragança, Lisboa, Guarda-Mor Edições.
 Afonso Eduardo Martins Zuquete (dir.)(1989), Nobreza de Portugal e Brasil, vol. I, Lisboa, Editorial Enciclopédia.
  (reprint)

External links
 History of titles of the kings of Portugal with bibliography

Portugal
Lists of Portuguese people
Portuguese history timelines
 
Portugal politics-related lists